USS SC-1316 was a 110-foot submarine chaser in the United States Navy during World War II.

The vessel was constructed and launched in 1943 in Nyack, New York. SC-1316 later was converted to a fishing vessel and renamed Helen E.

Helen E. was operated out of Coos Bay, Oregon, before it was grounded at Horsfall Beach near its home port. Someone burned the vessel after crews were unable to salvage Helen E.

References

SC-497-class submarine chasers
1943 ships